40 Tenth Avenue (originally referred to as Solar Carve) is an office building in the Meatpacking District of Manhattan in New York City.  The structure is adjacent to the High Line.

Planning and development
The building was first proposed in 2012, with designs released to the public then. Plans were later approved in 2014. Construction began in 2017 Advanced by Cauldwell Wingate Company and the project received $120 million in construction financing from Bank OZK in September 2017. The building topped out in early 2018 and was completed in late 2018, with the first tenants expected to move in to the building in March 2019.

Hyundai's luxury car brand Genesis signed a lease for all  of retail space in the building in December 2017. In March 2019, Starwood Capital Group signed a lease for the building's eighth floor.

Design and reception
40 Tenth Avenue is Studio Gang's first commission in New York. The building features a chiseled, diamond-shaped curtain wall that was engineered to eliminate shadows cast onto the adjacent High Line park. Additionally, the facade allegedly minimized heat gain, reduced glare for drivers on the West Side Highway, and discouraged migratory birds strikes.

Justin Davidson, writing for New York, referred to the structure as "...one of the most exciting chapters in the future of the High Line." Similarly, Architectural Digest named the building one of their "14 Most Anticipated Buildings of 2019".

References

2010s in Manhattan
2018 establishments in New York City
Commercial buildings completed in 2018
Meatpacking District, Manhattan
Office buildings in Manhattan
Studio Gang Architects buildings